Bannockburn is a suburb in the City of Logan, Queensland, Australia.

Geography
The Albert River marks the eastern boundary of the suburb.

The Beaudesert–Beenleigh Road runs along the western boundary.

History
The median age of the Bannockburn population was 43 years, 6 years above the national median of 37.  73.9% of people living in Bannockburn were born in Australia. The other top responses for country of birth were England 9.2%, New Zealand 6.8%, India 1.5%, Italy 0.9%, Ireland 0.9%.  92.6% of people spoke only English at home; the next most common languages were 1.5% Gujarati, 0.9% Hungarian, 0.7% Dutch, 0.7% Italian, 0.7% Danish.

References

External links

 

Suburbs of Logan City